Ezra Frank Kysor (1835–1907) was an American architect from Los Angeles, California.  He is believed to be the first professional architect to practice in Southern California.

Biography

Early life
Ezra Kysor was born on August 6, 1835, in Cattaraugus, New York. Around the age of thirty, he traveled west to Virginia City, Nevada.

Career
Upon his arrival in Virginia City c.1865, Kysor established himself as a carpenter. He may also have maintained an architectural office. By 1868, however, he had settled in Los Angeles, California, as an architect.

He practiced alone until March 1875, when he established Kysor & Mathews with Walter J. Mathews (1850-1947).  This firm was dissolved in April 1876.  He was again alone until 1879, when John F. Hennessy (1853-1924) became a member of Kysor & Hennessy.  Hennessy, who was born in Ireland and came to the United States in 1875 or 1876, left Los Angeles for Australia in late 1880.

Upon Hennessy's departure, Kysor made his chief draftsman, Octavius Morgan (1850-1922), a member of Kysor & Morgan.  In 1886, John A. Walls (1858-1922) was added, the firm becoming Kysor, Morgan & Walls.    It was around this time the Kysor began to withdraw from practice, to focus on real estate speculation.  He retired from the firm completely in 1890, which became Morgan & Walls.

Personal life
He was married to Clara Perry. They had a son, Charles H. Kysor (1883-1954), who was also an architect.

Architectural works

Private practice, 1868-1875
 Episcopal Church of Our Savior, 535 W. Roses Rd., San Gabriel, CA (1869–71)
 Pico House, 494 N. Main St., Los Angeles, CA (1869–70)
 Merced Theatre, 420 N. Main St., Los Angeles, CA (1870)
 William Workman House (Remodeling), 15415 E. Don Julian Rd., Industry, CA (1870)
 Congregation B'nai B'rith, 218 S. Broadway, Los Angeles, CA (1872–73) - Demolished.
 Samuel C. Foy House, 1337 Carroll Ave., Los Angeles, CA (1872)
 Los Angeles High School, N. Broadway & Temple St., Los Angeles, CA (1872–73) - Demolished.
 Ducommun Building, 304 N. Main St., Los Angeles, CA (1874) - Demolished.
Farmers and Merchants Bank of Los Angeles second building, west side of Main St. south of Plaza, Los Angeles, CA (1874) - Demolished.
 Harris Newmark House, 233 S. Broadway, Los Angeles, CA (1874) - Demolished.

Kysor & Mathews, 1875-1876
 Anaheim Hotel, 182 W. Center St., Anaheim, CA (1875) - Demolished.
 Cardona Block, 118 N. Main St., Los Angeles, CA (1875) - Demolished.
 R. C. Cathedral of St. Vibiana (Completion), 214 S. Main St., Los Angeles, CA (1875–76)
 Herman W. Hellman House, 125 W. 4th St., Los Angeles, CA (1875) - Demolished.
 McDonald Block, 129-131 N. Main St., Los Angeles, CA (1876) - Demolished.
 William H. Perry House, 3800 Homer St., Los Angeles, CA (1876)

Private practice, 1876-1878
 Joseph Mullally House, 850 N. Broadway, Los Angeles, CA (1876) - Demolished.
 Hellman & Mascarel Block, 230-240 N. Main St., Los Angeles, CA (1878) - Demolished.

Kysor & Hennessy, 1879-1880
 Horticultural Pavilion, Temple St., Los Angeles, CA (1879) - Burned.

Kysor & Morgan, 1880-1886
 University Building, University of Southern California, Los Angeles, CA (1880)
 Garnier Block, 501 N. Main St., Los Angeles, CA (1882–83)
 Hotel Nadeau, 202 W. 1st St., Los Angeles, CA (1882–83) - Demolished 1932.
 Grand Opera House, 110 S. Main St., Los Angeles, CA (1883–84) - Demolished.
 First Baptist Church, 556 S. Broadway, Los Angeles, CA (1883–84) - Demolished.
 Placentia School, Placentia & Chapman Aves., Anaheim, CA (1884) - Demolished.
 Los Angeles Infirmary, 1111 W. Sunset Blvd., Los Angeles, CA (1884) - Demolished.
 Trinity M. E. Church, 522 S. Broadway, Los Angeles, CA (1884) - Demolished.

Kysor, Morgan & Walls, 1886-1890
 Law Building, 125 Temple St., Los Angeles, CA (1886) - Demolished.
 Los Angeles National Bank Building, 100-104 N. Spring St., Los Angeles, CA (1886–87) - Demolished.
 Abstract Title & Insurance Co. Building, 203 New High St., Los Angeles, CA (1887) - Demolished.
 Granite Bank Building, 230 S. Myrtle Ave., Monrovia, CA (1887) - Demolished.
 Hazard's Pavilion, 427 W. 5th St., Los Angeles, CA (1887) - Demolished 1905.
 Los Angeles Orphans' Home, 817 Yale St., Los Angeles, CA (1887) - Demolished.
 Palomares Hotel, 350 N. Garey Ave., Pomona, CA (1887) - Burned 1911.
 Michael Sanders House, 1345 Carroll Ave., Los Angeles, CA (1887)
 Turn Halle, 321 S. Main St., Los Angeles, CA (1887) - Demolished.
 Gates Building, 215 W. 5th St., Los Angeles, CA (1888) - Demolished.
 Frank Sabichi House, 2437 S. Figueroa St., Los Angeles, CA (1888) - Demolished.
 Annex Building, State Normal School, S. Grand Ave., Los Angeles, CA (1889) - Demolished.
 Gymnasium, State Normal School, S. Grand Ave., Los Angeles, CA (1890) - Demolished.

See also

 Central Business District, Los Angeles (1880-1899)

References

1835 births
1907 deaths
Architects from Los Angeles
19th-century American architects